Jan Carel Josephus van Speyk (31 January 1802 – 5 February 1831) was a Dutch naval lieutenant commander with the United Netherlands Navy who became a hero in the Netherlands for his opposition to the Belgian Revolution.

Life

Early life 
Born in Amsterdam in 1802, Van Speyk was orphaned at the age of 10. When he was 18 years old, he joined the United Netherlands Navy and served in the Dutch East Indies from 1823 to 1825. He successfully attacked Bangka and Java, which earned him the nickname "Terror of the Bandits".

When the Belgian Revolution began, Van Speyk was given command of a gunboat. Van Speyk despised the Belgian independence movement, and he said he would rather die "than become an infamous Brabander".

Death 
On 5 February 1831, a gale blew his gunboat into the quay at the port of Antwerp. The Belgians quickly stormed his ship, demanding Van Speyk haul down the Dutch flag. Rather than surrender his ship, he fired a pistol (some versions say he threw a lighted cigar) into a barrel of gunpowder in the ship's magazine. According to legend he shouted, "I'd rather be blown up then". The number of Belgians killed is unknown, though it probably numbered in the dozens. Twenty-eight of his 31 crewmen also perished in the blast.

Legacy 

Eight days' after Van Speyk's death, the Netherlands declared a period of mourning. His remains were buried in the Nieuwe Kerk in Amsterdam, where the remains of Dutch naval hero Michiel de Ruyter also are interred.

Van Speyk is regarded as a naval hero in the Netherlands. This resulted in a royal decree (Koninklijk Besluit number 81, 11 February 1833) issued by King William I pronouncing that as long as the Dutch Navy exists there will always be a ship named Van Speijk to preserve his memory. Her predecessor, the frigate , launched in 1965, was the lead ship of her own class. The mast of Van Speyk's ship is preserved at the Royal Netherlands Naval College.

For his actions as captain of Gunboat Number 2, Van Speyk was decorated with the Knight's Cross (4th class) of the Military Order of William. A national memorial in his honour is located at the J.C.J. van Speijk Lighthouse in Egmond aan Zee.

References 

 Encarta-encyclopedia Winkler Prins (1993–2002) s.v. Speijk, Jan Carel Josephus van. Microsoft Corporation/Het Spectrum.

External links 
 

19th-century Dutch military personnel
1802 births
1831 deaths
Burials at the Nieuwe Kerk, Amsterdam
Dutch military personnel who committed suicide
Knights Fourth Class of the Military Order of William
Military personnel from Amsterdam
Royal Netherlands Navy officers